Peptidoglycan beta-N-acetylmuramidase (exo-beta-N-acetylmuramidase, exo-beta-acetylmuramidase, beta-2-acetamido-3-O-(D-1-carboxyethyl)-2-deoxy-D-glucoside acetamidodeoxyglucohydrolase) is an enzyme with systematic name peptidoglycan beta-N-acetylmuramoylexohydrolase. This enzyme catalyses the following chemical reaction

 Hydrolysis of terminal, non-reducing N-acetylmuramic residues

References

External links 
 

EC 3.2.1